Statue of Prince Henry the Navigator may refer to:
Prince Henry the Navigator (statue), in Fall River, Massachusetts, United States
Statue of Prince Henry the Navigator, London, in Belgrave Square, London, England
Statue of Prince Henry the Navigator, Lisbon, in Belem, Lisbon, Portugal, as part of Padrão dos Descobrimentos, the Monument of the Discoveries